Neocladura is a genus of crane fly in the family Limoniidae.

Distribution
United States and Canada

Species
N. americana (Alexander, 1917)
N. delicatula (Alexander, 1914)

References

Limoniidae
Nematocera genera
Diptera of North America